International Open may refer to:

 International Open Series, a pro-am series of snooker tournaments, also known as the Pontin's International Open Series for promotional purposes
 Scottish Open (snooker), a professional snooker tournament formerly known as the International Open
 International GT Open, a grand tourer-style sports car racing founded in 2006 by the Spanish GT Sport Organización. It is a spin-off of the Spanish GT Championship, and uses a similar format, except its races are held internationally
 Eastbourne International, a tennis tournament on the WTA Tour and on the ATP World Tour, formerly known as the "International Women's Open".
 International Tennis Open, a sports video game developed by Infogrames Multimedia and published by Philips Interactive Media in 1992
 German Open Tennis Championships, a tennis tournament the ATP World Tour, formerly known as the "International German Open"